The Austrian Supercup (German: ÖFB-Supercup) was a football competition held annually from 1986 until 2004 between the winners of the Austrian Football Bundesliga and the Austrian Cup.

19 editions were played during the short history of the competition.

Results of the finals

Notes:
The Winner is typed in Bold.
 The 1992–93 Austrian Cup Winners, Wacker Innsbruck lost its license and they were replaced by the new formed team Tirol Innsbruck, which are the continuation of their in the city of Innsbruck.
 The 2001–02 Bundesliga Champion, Tirol Innsbruck were refused a license for the 2002–03 season and they were replaced by Sturm Graz, the 2001–02 Bundesliga Runner-up.

Performance

Performance by club

Notes:
  All teams are defunct clubs from Innsbruck, Tirol. Wacker Innsbruck (1915–1999), Swarovski Tirol (1986–1992) and Tirol Innsbruck (1993–2002). They are considered to be the continuation of the each other.
  The Red Bull company bought the club on 6 April 2005 and rebranded it. Prior 2005 the team was known as SV Austria Salzburg or Casino Salzburg. They also changed the colours from white-violet in red-white. The Violet-Whites ultimately formed a new club, SV Austria Salzburg.
 * FC Admira Wacker Mödling was formed after the merger of SK Admira Wien and SC Wacker Wien in 1971, under the name of Admira Wacker Wien, the merge with VfB Mödling in 1997 and the merge with SK Schwadorf in 2008. The new team play in Mödling.

Performance by qualification

See also
Austrian Cup
Austrian Football Bundesliga
List of Austrian football champions

References

External links
Austria – List of Super Cup Finals at the RSSSF

S
Austria
Defunct sports competitions in Austria
1986 establishments in Austria
2004 disestablishments in Austria
Recurring sporting events established in 1986
Recurring sporting events disestablished in 2004